Yuen Ho Chun (born 19 July 1995 in Hong Kong) is a Hong Kong professional football player who plays as a goalkeeper for Hong Kong Premier League club Lee Man.

Club career

In 2010, Yuen joined Hong Kong First Division club Sun Pegasus.

In 2014, Yuen was loaned to Tai Po.

In 2015, Yuen returned to Hong Kong Premier League club Pegasus.

On 17 July 2018, Lee Man announced the signing of Yuen. Upon his debut for the club, he made a crucial error leading to a 2–0 against Kitchee on 31 August 2018.

Honours

Club
Lee Man
 Hong Kong Sapling Cup: 2018–19

References

External links
 
 

1995 births
Living people
Hong Kong footballers
Hong Kong Premier League players
South China AA players
Tai Po FC players
TSW Pegasus FC players
Lee Man FC players
Association football goalkeepers
Footballers at the 2018 Asian Games
Asian Games competitors for Hong Kong